The Black Prince's Ruby is a large, irregular cabochon red spinel weighing  set in the cross pattée above the Cullinan II diamond at the front of the Imperial State Crown of the United Kingdom. The spinel is one of the oldest parts of the Crown Jewels of the United Kingdom, with a history dating back to the middle of the 14th century. It has been in the possession of England's rulers since it was given in 1367 to its namesake, Edward of Woodstock (the "Black Prince"). The stone is believed to have originated from the Badakhshan mines in present day Afghanistan and Tajikistan, the principal source of large spinel gems in the Middle Ages.

Spinel
All red gemstones used to be referred to as rubies or "balas rubies". It was not until 1783 that spinels were chemically differentiated from rubies. They both have aluminium, oxygen, and a little chromium, but spinels also have magnesium, which rubies lack.

History

Don Pedro of Seville

The Black Prince's Ruby dates back to the middle of the 14th century as the possession of Abū Sa'īd, the Arab Muslim Prince of Granada. At that time, the rule of Castile was being centralized to Seville and the Moorish Kingdom of Granada was being systematically attacked and reverted to Castilian rule as a part of the Christian Reconquest of the Iberian peninsula. Abū Sa'īd in particular was confronted by the belligerency of nascent Castile under the rule of Peter of Castile, also known to history as either Don Pedro the Cruel, or Don Pedro the Just. According to historical accounts, Abū Sa'īd wished to surrender to Don Pedro, but the conditions he offered were unclear. What is clear is that Don Pedro welcomed his coming to Seville. It is recorded that he greatly desired Abū Sa'īd's wealth.  When Abū Sa'īd met with Don Pedro, the King had Abū Sa'īd's servants killed and may have personally stabbed Sa'īd to death himself.  When Sa'īd's corpse was searched, the spinel was found and added to Don Pedro's possessions.

In 1366, Don Pedro's illegitimate brother, Henry of Trastámara, led a revolt against Don Pedro. Lacking the power to put down the revolt unaided, Don Pedro made an alliance with the Black Prince, the son of Edward III of England. The revolt was successfully put down and the Black Prince demanded the ruby in exchange for the services he had rendered. He  later returned to England with King Pedro's two daughters, Dona Constanza of Castile and Dona Isabel of Castile, and marriages were contracted for them to the king's brothers. It is assumed that the Black Prince took the Ruby back to England at that time, although it disappears from historical records until 1415.

A wartime adornment
During his campaign in France, Henry V of England wore a gem-encrusted helmet that included the Black Prince's Ruby. In the Battle of Agincourt on 25 October 1415, the French Duke of Alençon struck Henry on the head with a battleaxe, and Henry nearly lost both the helmet and his life. The battle was won by Henry's forces and the Black Prince's Ruby was saved. Richard III is supposed to have worn the gemstone in his helmet at the Battle of Bosworth in 1485, in which he was killed.

Crown Jewels
Henry VIII's inventory of 1521 mentions "a great balas ruby" set in the Tudor Crown, thought to be the Black Prince's Ruby. It remained there until the time of Oliver Cromwell in the 17th century. With the exception of the Coronation Chair and several other items, Cromwell had the principal symbols of the king's power – the Crown Jewels – disassembled and sold, and the gold was melted down and made into coins. What happened to the Black Prince's Ruby, then valued at £4 (equivalent to £ as of ), during the Commonwealth of England is not clear, but it came back into the possession of Charles II when the monarchy was restored in 1660. At the coronation of Queen Victoria in 1838, she was crowned with a new Imperial State Crown made for her by Rundell and Bridge, with 3,093 gems, including the spinel at the front. The Queen can be clearly seen wearing the jewel in the Imperial State Crown in her official coronation portrait by Sir George Hayter. This was remade in 1937 into the current, lighter, crown. A plaquette on the reverse of the gemstone commemorates the crown's history.

See also
 List of individual gemstones

References

Crown Jewels of the United Kingdom
Individual spinels
Edward the Black Prince